Lake Toba (Toba Batak: ᯖᯀᯬ ᯖᯬᯅ; romanized: Tao Toba) is a large natural lake in North Sumatra, Indonesia, occupying the caldera of a supervolcano. It is the largest lake in Indonesia and the largest volcanic lake in the world. Toba Caldera is one of twenty Geoparks in Indonesia, and was recognised in July 2020 as one of the UNESCO Global Geoparks.

Lake Toba is the site of a supervolcanic eruption estimated at VEI 8 that occurred 69,000 to 77,000 years ago, representing a climate-changing event. Recent advances in dating methods suggest a more accurate identification of 74,000 years ago as the date. It is the largest-known explosive eruption on Earth in the last 25 million years. According to the Toba catastrophe theory, it had global consequences for human populations; it killed most humans living at that time and is believed to have created a population bottleneck in central east Africa and India, which affects the genetic make-up of the human worldwide population to the present. More recent studies have cast doubt on this theory and found no evidence of substantial changes in global population.

Additional studies in Lake Malawi in East Africa show significant amounts of ash being deposited from the Toba Caldera eruptions, even at that great distance, but little indication of a significant climatic effect in East Africa.

Geology

The Toba Caldera in North Sumatra comprises four overlapping volcanic craters that adjoin the Sumatran "volcanic front". At  it is the world's largest Quaternary caldera, and the fourth and youngest caldera. It intersects the three older calderas. An estimated  of dense-rock equivalent pyroclastic material, known as the youngest Toba tuff, was released during one of the largest explosive volcanic eruptions in recent geological history. Following this eruption, a resurgent dome formed within the new caldera, joining two half-domes separated by a longitudinal graben.

At least four cones, four stratovolcanoes, and three craters are visible in the lake. The Tandukbenua cone on the northwestern edge of the caldera has only sparse vegetation, suggesting a young age of several hundred years. Also, the Pusubukit (Hill Center) volcano ( above sea level) on the south edge of the caldera is solfatarically active.

Major eruption

The Toba eruption (the Toba event) occurred at what is now Lake Toba about 73,700±300 years ago. It was the last in a series of at least four caldera-forming eruptions at this location, with the earlier known caldera having formed around 1.2 million years ago. This last eruption had an estimated VEI=8, making it the largest-known explosive volcanic eruption in the Quaternary.

However, as more outcrops become available, Toba possibly erupted  of ignimbrite and co-ignimbrite.

The subsequent collapse formed a caldera that filled with water, creating Lake Toba. The island in the center of the lake is formed by a resurgent dome.

The exact year of the eruption is unknown, but the pattern of ash deposits suggests that it occurred during the northern summer because only the summer monsoon could have deposited Toba ashfall in the South China Sea. Ice cores from Greenland record a pulse of starkly reduced levels of organic carbon sequestration. Very few plants or animals in southeast Asia would have survived, and it is possible that the eruption caused a planet-wide die-off. However, the global cooling has been discussed by Rampino and Self. Their conclusion is that the cooling had already started before Toba's eruption. This conclusion was supported by Lane and Zielinski who studied the lake-core from Africa and GISP2. They concluded that there was no volcanic winter after the Toba eruption and that high H2SO4 deposits do not cause long-term effects. Furthermore, due to the low solubility of sulfur in the magma, the emission of volatiles and climate impacts are likely limited.

Evidence from studies of mitochondrial DNA suggests that humans may have passed through a genetic bottleneck around this time that reduced genetic diversity below what would be expected given the age of the species. According to the Toba catastrophe theory, proposed by Stanley H. Ambrose of the University of Illinois at Urbana–Champaign in 1998, the effects of the Toba eruption may have decreased the size of human populations to only a few tens of thousands of individuals. However, this hypothesis is not widely accepted because similar effects on other animal species have not been observed, and paleoanthropology suggests there was no population bottleneck. The genetic bottleneck is now recognized to be the Out-of-Africa founder effect, rather than an actual reduction in population.

More recent activity
Since the major eruption ~70,000 years ago, eruptions of smaller magnitude have also occurred at Toba. The small cone of Pusukbukit formed on the southwestern margin of the caldera and lava domes. The most recent eruption may have been at Tandukbenua on the northwestern caldera edge, suggested by a lack of vegetation that could be due to an eruption within the last few hundred years.

Some parts of the caldera have shown uplift due to partial refilling of the magma chamber, for example, pushing Samosir Island and the Uluan Peninsula above the surface of the lake. The lake sediments on Samosir Island show that it has risen by at least  since the cataclysmic eruption. Such uplifts are common in very large calderas, apparently due to the upward pressure of below-ground magma. Toba is probably the largest resurgent caldera on Earth. Such earthquakes have also been recorded in 1892, 1916, and 1920–1922.

In 2016, a study revealed that the Toba Supervolcano has a magma chamber containing  of eruptible magma, about  underground. This makes the supervolcano's magma chamber more than four times larger than the volume of Lake Superior in North America, and also larger than the magma chamber underneath Yellowstone.

Lake Toba lies near the Great Sumatran fault, which runs along the centre of Sumatra in the Sumatra Fracture Zone. The volcanoes of Sumatra and Java are part of the Sunda Arc, a result of the northeasterly movement of the Indo-Australian Plate, which is sliding under the eastward-moving Eurasian Plate.

People

Most of the people who live around Lake Toba are ethnically Bataks. Traditional Batak houses are noted for their distinctive roofs (which curve upwards at each end, as a boat's hull does) and their colorful decor.

Transportation
Parapat is located on the edge of the lake, which is the transit point to travel the lake and Samosir Island. Medan is about 173 km by road from the town and is connected via the Trans-Sumatran Highway to Pematang Siantar by a 48 km road. Sisingamangaraja XII International Airport is located about 47 mi (76 km) from Parapat.

Flora and fauna
The flora of the lake includes various types of phytoplankton, emerged macrophytes, floating macrophytes, and submerged macrophytes, while the surrounding countryside is rainforest including areas of Sumatran tropical pine forests on the higher mountainsides.

The fauna includes several species of zooplankton and benthic animals. Since the lake is oligotrophic (nutrient-poor), the native fish fauna is relatively scarce, and the only endemics are Rasbora tobana (strictly speaking near-endemic, since also found in some tributary rivers that run into the lake) and Neolissochilus thienemanni, locally known as the Batak fish. The latter species is threatened by deforestation (causing siltation), pollution, changes in water level and the numerous fish species that have been introduced to the lake. Other native fishes include species such as Aplocheilus panchax, Nemacheilus pfeifferae, Homaloptera gymnogaster, Channa gachua, Channa striata, Clarias batrachus, Barbonymus gonionotus, Barbonymus schwanenfeldii, Danio albolineatus, Osteochilus vittatus, Puntius binotatus, Rasbora jacobsoni, Tor tambra, Betta imbellis, Betta taeniata and Monopterus albus. Among the many introduced species are Anabas testudineus, Oreochromis mossambicus, Oreochromis niloticus, Ctenopharyngodon idella, Cyprinus carpio, Osphronemus goramy, Trichogaster pectoralis, Trichopodus trichopterus, Poecilia reticulata and Xiphophorus hellerii.

Sinking of MV Sinar Bangun

On 18 June 2018, Lake Toba was the scene of a ferry disaster, in which over 160 people drowned. MV Sinar Bangun was an irregular operating vessel on the lake which capsized with many passengers on board. The incident caused the death of 167 people and injuries to a number of others. Preliminary reports found the vessel was in operation with irregularities. Ignoring overloading on the vessel and operating in rough weather conditions were concluded as the main reasons leading to the disaster.

In popular culture
The Origin of Lake Toba is a folk story about the lake, in which once upon a time, there was a fisherman who caught a golden fish. Samosir Island is believed to be the golden fish's son.

Gallery

See also

 List of lakes of Indonesia
 List of volcanoes in Indonesia
 Mount Sinabung
 Lake Taupō
 Yellowstone Caldera
 La Garita Caldera

References

Further reading

External links

 Toba, Sumatra, Indonesia – Volcano.oregonstate.edu Accessed 11 December 2005
 Stanley H. Ambrose, Volcanic Winter, and Differentiation of Modern Humans Accessed 11 December 2005
 Joel Achenbach, Who Knew, National Geographic Accessed 11 December 2005
 (Lake Toba Ecosystem Management Plan) From laketoba.org 
 Magma 'Pancakes' May Have Fueled Toba Supervolcano
 

 
Batak
Volcanic crater lakes
Lakes of Sumatra
Tourist attractions in Indonesia
Tourist attractions in North Sumatra
Subduction volcanoes
Supervolcanoes
VEI-8 volcanoes
Calderas of Indonesia
Volcanoes of Sumatra
Landforms of North Sumatra
Pleistocene calderas